Syvash is a village in Henichesk Raion of Kherson Oblast, Ukraine with a population of 257. It belongs to Henichesk urban hromada, one of the hromadas of Ukraine.

References

Villages in Henichesk Raion